18 Pages is a 2022 Indian Telugu-language romantic thriller film written by Sukumar and directed by Palnati Surya Pratap. Produced by GA2 Pictures and Sukumar Writings, the film stars Nikhil Siddharth and Anupama Parameswaran. It received mixed to positive reviews from critics and the general public.

Plot 
Siddu's girlfriend cheats on him with another guy which leads him into a depressed state to which he finds a book on the road where he collapses. As he decides to burn all of his memories with his ex-girlfriend, He discovers the book he found on the road and begins to read it. 

The book happens to be a diary that belonged to Nandini. Nandini is a strange woman who doesn't use a Mobile Phone, and believes in human interaction. Siddu connects with the diary and develops feelings for the woman. Nandini visited Hyderabad to deliver a letter from her grandfather to a man named Venkat Rao. Through her journey of contacting him, she was attacked by anonymous people and was in deep trouble.

After 18 pages of reading, the diary happened to be empty and at first, he thought she stopped journalling since her task was completed. When he goes to meet her at her hometown, Siddu discovers a shocking revelation from Nandini's grandmother that both Nandini and her friend Sanjana died in a car accident a year prior.

Siddu couldn't digest the fact that the woman he loved had died. Through the advice from his grandfather, he decides to complete her unattended tasks to make himself and everyone around feel that Nandini is alive. As he completes those tasks, he gets to know that Nandini may still be alive through a bus conductor who happened to see Nandini in the ICU 2 days after she was believed to be dead. 

To find more clues as to where Nandini is, Siddu begins his search for the letter that was supposed to be passed to Venkat Rao. Siddu finds out that an architect Talwar was trying to kill Nandini for that cover as it contains proof to a case that he is being prosecuted against and hopes to destroy it. 

Siddu finally knows that Nandini is alive and well through Dr. Sandeep, who happens to know Nandini and is also Siddu's neighbour. Siddu decides to not meet her as he understands that she may not love him back. 

Six months later, Nandini returns to her regular life and is surprised to see all her tasks she hoped to complete before the accident accomplished by Siddu. She ponders his identity and enquires with the bus conductor, Sandeep and Siddu’s best friend, Bhagi. She finds out that Siddu will be going to Kashi to commemorate the death anniversary of Nandini's parents. In hopes to find Siddu, she unexpectedly bumps into him and reciprocates the feeling 'Love' back. 

It is later revealed that in one of the tasks of Nandini, it was to buy a watch for an anonymous person who guarded her in a riot and broke his watch in the process. That person just so happened to be Siddu.

Cast 
 Nikhil Siddhartha as Siddhu
 Anupama Parameswaran as Nandini
 Dinesh Tej as Dr Sandeep.B
 Sarayu Roy as Bhagi, Siddhu’s bestfriend
 Ajay as Rakesh Talwar
 Posani Krishna Murali  as Lawyer Padmanabham
 Brahmaji as Mokkajona Joginatham aka Mojo
 Mounika Reddy as Sanjana, Nandini’s bestfriend
 Goldie Nissy as Aarti
 Goparaju Ramana as Conductor
 Raghu Babu as Client
 Kancharapalem Raju as Nandini’s grandfather 
 Tenali Shakuntala as Nandini’s grandmother 
 Vadlamani Srinivas as Judge Vasudev
 Vamsi Nakkanti as Siddhu’s father
 Ravi Varma as Ajith, Siddhu’s boss
 Raj Tirandasu as Rasheed

Production 
The principal photography of the film began in October 2020 in Hyderabad. Filming finished on 23 October 2022.

Music 
Music is composed by Gopi Sundar.

References

External links 
 

Indian romantic comedy films
Geetha Arts films
Films scored by Gopi Sundar
2022 films
2020s Telugu-language films
2022 romantic comedy films
Films shot in Hyderabad, India
Films set in Hyderabad, India